Peter Vanden Gheyn ( or ; 1605 or 1607–1654 or 1659) was a bellfounder of the Spanish Netherlands (now Belgium).

Life
Peter was born into a famous family of bellfounders and himself became the most famous bellfounder of the 17th century. His father was Jan III Vanden Gheyn. The family forge was at Mechelen in what is now Belgium. His associate was named Peter Deklerk or de Clerck, his uncle by marriage.

His total production of bells was not great.

He had the curious affectation of inscribing his bells using type of various sizes within the same word.

References

Citations

Bibliography
 
 . 
 .

Year of birth uncertain
Year of death uncertain
1600s births
1650s deaths
Belgian metalsmiths
Dutch metalsmiths